The 1993 Berkshire County Council election was held on 6 May 1993, at the same time as other local elections across England and Wales. All of Berkshire County Council's 76 seats were up for election.

Prior to the election, the county council had been under no overall control, with a coalition of Labour, the Liberal Democrats and independents running the authority. The Labour leader, Lawrence Silverman, had been leader of the council. After the election, there was still no overall control of the council, but the Liberal Democrats became the largest party. The Conservatives lost over half their seats on the council. It was decided after the election that the coalition would continue, but with the Liberal Democrat leader, Linda Murray, being declared joint leader alongside Lawrence Silverman at the subsequent annual council meeting on 22 May 1993.

The 1993 election turned out to be the final election to Berkshire County Council. It was decided in 1996 to abolish the county council and transfer its functions to the county's six district councils, making them unitary authorities. The elections that would have been held for Berkshire County Council in 1997 were therefore cancelled, with elections being held instead for the six districts that year. Berkshire County Council continued to exist until 31 March 1998, with the new unitary authorities assuming their new powers on 1 April 1998.

Results

Ward results
The results in each ward were as follows (candidates with an asterisk* were the previous incumbent standing for re-election):

References

Berkshire County Council elections
Berkshire